Felicia Michaels (born 1964) is an American stand-up comedian.

Career
Michaels was born in Kansas and grew up in Fountain Head, Colorado. She began working as a comedian aged 18. During the 1990s, she shifted her stand-up persona from a dumb-blonde stereotype to a soft-spoken provocateur with an unrepentantly blue sense of humor. She explores such topics as the dynamics of the male/female relationship, "dirty thoughts," and the proliferation of the sensual feminist.

She has appeared in three movies: Smart Alex, directed by Steve Oedekerk; Los Enchiladas, directed by Mitch Hedberg; and, most recently, I Am Comic, directed by Jordan Brady. She was a regular on the TV show Parental Discretion.

She posed nude for Playboy and was featured in the October 1992 issue.

She is also a photographer, and her 2008 photography project, titled "Stand Up / Stripped Down", documents comedians and the mystery of what happens backstage in the shadows that lead from the green room to the power of the stage. "Stand Up / Stripped Down" received first place for the people's choice at the 2008 edition of The Prix de la Photographie, Paris, for photojournalism.

She is also a recipient of a CINE Golden Eagle Award for In The Weeds, a short film she wrote and directed.

Michaels was the co-host of a popular weekly podcast with Joey Diaz named Beauty and Da Beast. It was nominated for Funniest Podcast by the Podcast awards in 2012.

In 2011, she released her second CD, entitled Chew On This, which continues where Lewd Awakenings left off.

Awards
Michaels was nominated twice for Funniest Female Comic by the American Comedy Awards; in 1999 she won the award. She has released one album, Lewd Awakenings, on the What Are Records label. She has appeared on such networks as Showtime, MTV, VH1, NBC, as well as appearing twice on ABC's Full House. She was also a Grand Champion on Star Search, where she made her national debut. She has also broadcast on XM Satellite Radio and Last.fm.

References

External links
Official site

Beauty and Da Beast

Living people
American women comedians
1964 births
People from Kansas
21st-century American women